Not Too Young To Run is an act of parliament, which sought to reduce the age limit of running for elective offices  in Nigeria. The campaign started in support of bills and motions in Nigeria's National Assembly sponsored by the Tony Nwulu in the House of Representatives and AbdulAziz Nyako in the Senate. The campaign is now global, symbolized by the hashtag #NotTooYoungToRun.

History of Not Too Young To Run bill
The Age Reduction Bill, popularly known as Not Too Young To Run bill, is a constitutional amendment movement led by young Nigerians. The bill was conceived and pushed by several civil society groups, including YIAGA Africa, beginning in May 2016. The group is headed by Samson Itodo, a human right activist and a good governance campaigner, who is AbdulAziz Nyako,  the Executive Director of YIAGA Africa. The bill was sponsored in House of Representatives by Tony Nwulu and in the Senate by AbdulAziz Nyako. The bill seeks alteration in sections 65, 106, 131, 177 of the Constitution of Nigeria, which has reduce the age of running for elective positions for the house of Assembly and House of Representatives from 30 years old to 25 years old, Senate and Governorship from 35 year old to 30-year-old and office of the president from 40 to 30 and independent candidature in Nigeria.

Advocacies
On 20th of April 2018, the promoters of the bill had a meeting with the Vice President, Yemi Osinbajo to advocate for the Presidency to assent to the bill. After approval, the movement sought the All Progressives Congress for reduction in the nomination form fee, as it was N55 million before it was reduced to N45 million. But the movement want the fee to be reduced to encourage involvement of youths in politics. Earlier, about six political party had pledged incentives for the Not-Too-Young-To-Run movement to encourage participation of young Nigerians in politics.

Passage of Not Too Young To Run bill at Nigeria Parliaments
The bill was first read at the House of Representatives and was passed with votes of (86-10) in the Senate on 26 July 2017, and 261-23 in the House of Representatives, on 27 July 2017. The bill passed first and second readings in Nigerian Parliament and was presented to Committee on Constitutional Review. 

For any constitutional amendment to become a law in Nigeria, the amendment also needs to be presented to the House of Assembly of the 36 states of the federation, and not less than 24 states (two-third) are expected to vote Yes to the amendment. It was reported that the House of Assembly in 33 Nigerian states voted Yes, except Zamfara, Lagos and Kano. 

The bill was rejected by Taraba State Assembly initially, but, was reversed after the group made a press release inaugurating the Taraba House of Assembly into the Hall of Shame. On 16th February 2018, the conveners gave the Nigerian Parliaments and their president 30days ultimatum to conclude the processes of passage and signing of the bill into law.

Assent to Not Too Young To Run bill by Nigeria's President
In April 2018, the Nigerian Senate resolved to transmit the Not Too Young To Run bill to the President of Nigeria. On 21st May 2018, 55 youth-led organizations gave President Buhari an 8-day ultimatum to assent to the bill. On 29th May 2018, the Nigerian President, Muhammadu Buhari, announced in his 'democracy day' national address that he planned to sign the bill into law. He subsequently signed the bill on 31st May 2018. On 31st May 2018, Muhammadu Buhari signed the Not Too Young To Run bill into law.

Political Controversy
There was a controversy that the Not Too Young To Run bill was removed from the constitutional review report during the Nigerian constitutional review meeting.

References

External links

Videos
 Full Video: Finally, President Muhammadu Buhari Signs Not Too Young To Run bill into Law
 Not Too Young Bill Campaigners Seek Passage of Law Within 30 Days
 President Buhari Signs Not Too Young To Run Bill into Law

Elections in Nigeria
Political organizations based in Nigeria
Youth in Nigeria